Richardson Creek is a tributary of the Rocky River in south-central North Carolina that rises in Union County near Monroe and then flows northeast through Anson County to the Rocky River.

Variant names
According to the Geographic Names Information System, it has also been known historically as:  
Richardsons Creek

See also
List of North Carolina rivers

References

Rivers of North Carolina
Rivers of Anson County, North Carolina
Rivers of Union County, North Carolina
Tributaries of the Pee Dee River